Hatipler is a village in the Amasra District, Bartın Province, Turkey. Its population is 80 (2021).

History 
The village has had the same name since 1928.

Geography 
The village is 29 km from Bartın city center and 14 km from Amasra town centre.

References

Villages in Amasra District